Thanasi Kokkinakis and Denis Kudla were the defending champions, but they did not participate this year. Johan Brunström and Nicholas Monroe won the title by defeating Sekou Bangoura and Frank Dancevic in the final by a score of 4–6, 6–3, [10–8].

Seeds

Draw

External links
 Main Draw

Nielsen Pro Tennis Championship - Doubles
2015 Doubles